Denticulobasis ariken is a species of damselfly in the family Coenagrionidae first identified in Rondônia, Brazil.

References

Coenagrionidae
Insects described in 2009